George Waldegrave, 4th Earl Waldegrave, Viscount Chewton, PC, ADC (23 November 1751 – 22 October 1789) was a British politician who sat in the House of Commons from 1774 to 1780.

The eldest son of the 3rd Earl of Waldegrave, he was educated at Eton and was commissioned into the 3rd Foot Guards in 1768. He purchased a Lieutenancy in 1773. On 16 May 1778 he transferred to the Coldstream Guards as a Captain-Lieutenant and on 4 October 1779, was appointed Lieutenant-Colonel of the new 87th Regiment of Foot (until 1783). In 1788 he was briefly made Colonel of the 63rd Regiment of Foot, transferring in 1789 to be Colonel of the 14th Regiment of Foot, a position he held equally briefly before his death later that year.

He inherited his father's titles in 1784. On 5 May 1782, Waldegrave married his first cousin, Lady Elizabeth Waldegrave and they had six children.
 Lady Maria Wilhelmina Waldegrave (1783 – 20 February 1805), married Nathaniel Micklethwaite. Had issue, a daughter, Charlotte.
 George Waldegrave, 5th Earl Waldegrave (13 July 1784 – 29 June 1794), died at the age of nine.
 Lieutenant-Colonel John Waldegrave, 6th Earl Waldegrave (31 July 1785 – 28 September 1846), married Anne King, by whom he had issue.
 Lieutenant Edward William Waldegrave (29 August 1787 – 22 January 1809), drowned at sea
 Vice-Admiral William Waldegrave, 8th Earl Waldegrave (27 October 1788 – 24 October 1859), married firstly Elizabeth Whitbread, had issue; secondly Sarah Whitear
 Lady Charlotte Waldegrave (2 December 1789 - 3 January 1790), born posthumously.

Ancestry

References

External links
 Stirnet: Waldegrave1 

|-

1751 births
1789 deaths
People from Mendip District
People from Somerset
People educated at Eton College
63rd Regiment of Foot officers
Members of the Parliament of Great Britain for Newcastle-under-Lyme
British MPs 1774–1780
British MPs 1784–1790
Coldstream Guards officers
Earls Waldegrave
Members of the Privy Council of Great Britain
Scots Guards officers
George Waldegrave, 4th Earl Waldegrave
West Yorkshire Regiment officers